Venerupis is a genus of marine bivalve molluscs in the family Veneridae commonly known as carpet shells. The valves are robust and rhomboidal with the umbones turned-in and nearer the anterior end. The posterior end is wedge-shaped and the internal margins of the valves are smooth. There are 3 or 4 cardinal teeth on each valve. The foot is large and the siphons are of medium length and united except at the very tip.

Species
The World Register of Marine Species (WoRMS) accepted the following species as valid in 2011:
 Venerupis anomala (Lamarck, 1818)
 Venerupis aspera (Quoy & Gaimard, 1835)
 Venerupis corrugata (Gmelin, 1791)
 Venerupis cumingii (G.B. Sowerby II, 1852)
 Venerupis galactites (Lamarck, 1818)
 Venerupis geographica (Gmelin, 1791)
 Venerupis glandina (Lamarck, 1818)
 Venerupis largillierti (Philippi, 1847)
 Venerupis rugosa (G.B. Sowerby II, 1854)
 Venerupis philippinarum (A. Adams & Reeve, 1850)
Synonyms
 Venerupis aurea (Gmelin, 1791): synonym of Polititapes aureus (Gmelin, 1791)
 Venerupis bruguieri (Hanley, 1845): synonym of Ruditapes bruguieri (Hanley, 1845)
 Venerupis cordieri (Deshayes, 1839): synonym of Irusella lamellifera (Conrad, 1837)
 Venerupis decussata (Linnaeus, 1758): synonym of Lajonkairia lajonkairii (Payraudeau, 1826)
 Venerupis declivis Sowerby, 1853: synonym of Venus declivis G. B. Sowerby II, 1853
 Venerupis dura (Gmelin, 1791): synonym of Polititapes durus (Gmelin, 1791)
 Venerupis lucens (Locard, 1886): synonym of Polititapes aureus (Gmelin, 1791)
 Venerupis saxatilis (Fleuriau de Bellevue, 1802): synonym of Venerupis corrugata (Gmelin, 1791)
 Venerupis senegalensis (Gmelin, 1791): synonym of Venerupis corrugata (Gmelin, 1791)

References

Veneridae
Bivalve genera